Echovirus 9 (also known as E-9, E.C.H.O. 9, and formerly Coxsackie A23 or A23 virus) is a serotype of echovirus. When first discovered, it was labelled as a coxsackie A virus, A23. It was later discovered that A23 was an echovirus antigenically identical to the already-known echovirus 9.

Echovirus 9 is the most common enterovirus type. It is a common cause of illness in humans, although unlike many enteroviruses, it rarely infects infants. Its transmission is facilitated by crowded conditions. Those who are slightly ill and children are at particular risk of contracting echovirus 9 (A23).

References

Further reading
ICTV 7th Report van Regenmortel, M.H.V., Fauquet, C.M., Bishop, D.H.L., Carstens, E.B., Estes, M.K., Lemon, S.M., Maniloff, J., Mayo, M.A., McGeoch, D.J., Pringle, C.R. and Wickner, R.B. (2000). Virus taxonomy. Seventh report of the International Committee on Taxonomy of Viruses. Academic Press, San Diego. p663 https://ictv.global/ictv/proposals/ICTV%207th%20Report.pdf

Enteroviruses
Infraspecific virus taxa